Carex fuliginosa, the short-leaved sedge, is a species of flowering plant  in the family Cyperaceae, with a circumpolar distribution, and found in mountains further south; such as the eastern Alps, the Carpathians and the Rockies. It is wind-pollinated.

References

External links
 Carex fuliginosa in Flora of North America @ efloras.org

fuliginosa
Flora of Norway
Flora of Svalbard
Flora of Sweden
Flora of Finland
Flora of Germany
Flora of Austria
Flora of Czechoslovakia
Flora of Poland
Flora of Italy
Flora of Slovenia
Flora of Romania
Flora of Bulgaria
Flora of Ukraine
Flora of North European Russia
Flora of East European Russia
Flora of Siberia
Flora of Kamchatka Krai
Flora of Khabarovsk Krai
Flora of Magadan Oblast
Flora of Sakhalin
Flora of the Kuril Islands
Flora of Korea
Flora of Alaska
Flora of Subarctic America
Flora of British Columbia
Flora of Alberta
Flora of Manitoba
Flora of Quebec
Flora of Montana
Flora of Wyoming
Flora of Utah
Flora of Colorado
Flora of Greenland
Plants described in 1801
Flora without expected TNC conservation status